The Oaks (also known as Abraham Ricks Plantation) is a historic residence near Tuscumbia in Colbert County, Alabama.  Ricks came to North Alabama from Halifax, North Carolina in the early 1820s.  He acquired a large plantation which he sold in 1826 and purchased nearby land, which was worked by the forced labour of enslaved people who he had brought with him. A log house had been built on the new property circa 1818, and Ricks built a new, larger house connected to it which was completed in 1832.  The house remained in the family until 1966, and is still in use as a private residence.

The original house is a -story log structure covered with weatherboards.  Exterior chimneys rest in each gable end, and a shed roofed porch projects from the rear of the house.  The log house is connected to the two-story main house by a one-story, gable roofed hall with two exterior doors and windows matching those of the main house.  The front façade of the main house is five bays wide, with a central portico supported by two square columns and topped with a deck.  The twin-leaf door is surrounded by sidelights and a transom; a similar door with sidelights opens to the deck above.  The portico is flanked by a pair of twelve-over-twelve sash windows on each side on both floors.  The interior has a center-hall layout with one room on either side of a main hall.

The house was listed on the National Register of Historic Places in 1976.

References

External links

National Register of Historic Places in Colbert County, Alabama
Houses on the National Register of Historic Places in Alabama
Georgian architecture in Alabama
Houses completed in 1818
Houses in Colbert County, Alabama
Plantation houses in Alabama
Historic American Buildings Survey in Alabama